The Guy Who Didn't Like Musicals is a horror comedy musical with music and lyrics by Jeff Blim and a book by Matt and Nick Lang. The show acted as the first installment in StarKid's Hatchetfield Series. Loosely inspired by Invasion of the Body Snatchers, it is the 11th stage show produced by StarKid Productions. The show follows Paul, an average guy “who doesn’t like musicals,” as his town is overcome by a musical alien hive mind. The show ran from October 11, 2018, to November 4, 2018, at the Matrix Theater in Los Angeles, California. A recording of the musical was uploaded to YouTube on December 24, 2018, which has since amassed over 6.7 million views as of January 2023.

Funding for the show was done through Kickstarter, similarly to StarKid's most recent shows. The project raised US$127,792 through 3,419 backers out of its $60,000 goal.

Synopsis

Act 1 
A group of singing zombies addresses the audience, setting the scene in the small town of Hatchetfield and introducing the main character, unremarkable everyman Paul Matthews. ("The Guy Who Didn't Like Musicals").

At his office, Paul is invited to a production of Mamma Mia! by his coworker Bill, but he declines. While at the local coffee shop, Paul meets Emma Perkins, a barista who shares his dislike of musicals. As he leaves the shop, an approaching storm forces him to shelter. The various residents of Hatchetfield express dismay over the weather, while a strange meteor strikes the local theater.

The next day, Paul encounters a group of people singing and dancing in unison ("La Dee Dah Dah Day"). Paul, deeply disturbed, arrives at work. He is called into his boss’s office but flees when his boss bursts into song ("What Do You Want, Paul?"). Rushing to the coffee shop, he tells Emma he thinks the world is becoming a musical. Emma, unconvinced, excuses herself to sing a tip song with her coworkers ("Cup of Roasted Coffee"). However, the customers collapse after drinking coffee infected by Emma’s coworkers. The zombified customers join the baristas in song ("Cup of Poisoned Coffee"), chasing Paul and Emma out of the shop.

Paul and Emma find Paul’s coworkers in an alleyway, where they learn the entire town is affected. Paul’s coworker Charlotte calls her husband Sam, a police officer, for help. An infected Sam attacks the group until he is knocked out ("Show Me Your Hands"). After discovering Sam’s blood is now bright blue, Emma proposes that they seek help from her biology professor, doomsday survivalist Professor Hidgens.

The group arrives at Hidgens' fortified home, where he explains that Sam’s blue blood and all the citizens' infection is the result of an alien invasion (arriving via the meteor that struck the theater), and restrains the unconscious Sam. When Sam wakes up, he convinces Charlotte to untie him ("You Tied Up My Heart"), then attacks and kills her.

Meanwhile, Emma and Paul become closer, where they discover Paul’s hatred of musicals was inspired by seeing Emma perform in Brigadoon  in high school. Their conversation is interrupted by a zombified Charlotte and Sam, who attack the group ("Join Us (And Die)"). Professor Hidgens returns, shooting and killing both of them.

Bill receives a phone call from his daughter Alice that she is trapped at school. Paul joins Bill on his rescue mission.

Act 2 
At the high school, Paul and Bill search for Alice. They find a zombified Alice, who claims Bill caused her death and he was never a good father ("Not Your Seed"). Bill, heartbroken, attempts to shoot himself but is instead killed by Alice. Right as she is about to attack Paul, the army arrives, scaring her away and knocking Paul out.

Back at Professor Hidgens' compound, Hidgens explains the aliens are a hivemind that communicates through music. Although this helps Emma realize how to stop it, Hidgens becomes convinced a hivemind could create a peaceful world. He sedates Emma to prevent her from spreading the information. Meanwhile, Paul wakes up and is greeted by General McNamara, who works with a special unit of the US Army called PEIP. McNamara tells him that if he can rescue Emma, the army will send a rescue helicopter.

Emma wakes up tied to a chair with Paul’s coworker Ted. Hidgens deactivates his house’s defenses and reveals he has a history in musical theatre. He intentionally attracts the aliens by singing the opening number of his musical Working Boys, a show glorifying his own undergrad experience (“Show Stopping Number”). The zombies arrive and Hidgens willingly joins them, convinced they’re his college friends. The zombies then tear him apart.

Paul arrives to rescue Emma and Ted and they head for the pickup site, but the zombies drag off Paul. Ted abandons them and continues running, making it to the pickup site before being shot. PEIP, now infected, is led by a zombified McNamara ("America Is Great Again"). Paul and Emma manage to escape to the helicopter, but they discover the pilot is infected. The resulting fight crashes the helicopter and pierces Emma’s leg with rebar. She tells him to leave her and destroy the meteor, ending the invasion. Paul arms himself with grenades and reluctantly leaves.

The zombies once again address the audience ("Let Him Come"). Paul enters the site of the meteor crash and is greeted by the reanimated bodies of the town residents. They claim they’re happy and ask what he wants, to which he replies it does not matter. They begin to sing, telling him that he must express his feelings through song. To his horror, his close proximity to the meteor is quickly infecting him. Paul switches rapidly between singing and talking, fighting for control against the infection. He manages to pull the pin on a grenade and throw it at the meteor, screaming that he doesn't like musicals ("Let It Out").

A newscast from the neighboring town of Clivesdale states that it has been two weeks since the previous events. Emma is in a hospital in Clivesdale and is now in witness protection. She is told there were no other survivors, but that she will be escorted to her new life by someone she knows. Paul enters, and Emma, overjoyed, embraces him. Paul begins to sing, telling her she lost. He is joined by other zombies and they sing a medley of previous songs in the show and implore her to join them, explaining that they have finally found happiness. They tell her the ending is "inevitable" and surround and drag her off stage ("Inevitable").

Roles

Cast

Characters 
 Paul Matthews, a guy who doesn't like musicals and is unsure of what he wants in life. He has a crush on Emma, and frequently visits the coffee shop she works at as an excuse to see her.
 Emma Perkins, a barista who is trying to work her way through community college. She hates Hatchetfield, her job, and musicals.
 Ted, the office asshole. He has been having an affair with Charlotte for some time.
 Charlotte, an anxious woman committed to a failing marriage with Sam. She is secretly cheating on Sam with Ted.
 Nora, Emma's boss at Beanie's.
 Bill, a divorced father trying to connect with his teenage daughter, Alice.
 Alice, a teenage girl who is caught between her parents' divorce and facing the struggles of growing up.
 Deb, Alice's bad-girl girlfriend.
 Zoey, a catty college girl who works with Emma. She loves musical theater, and is also having an affair with Sam.
 Professor Henry Hidgens, Emma's biology professor and doomsday survivalist.
 Mr. Davidson, Paul's laidback boss.
 Sam, Charlotte's cheating husband, a police officer who is having an affair with Zoey.
 General McNamara, a military general who finds Paul and tries to help. He works for PEIP, a secret organization that investigates paranormal, inter-dimensional, and extraterrestrial phenomena.

Creative team, crew, and musicians

Musical numbers 

Act 1
 "The Guy Who Didn't Like Musicals" - Ensemble
 "La Dee Dah Dah Day" - Greenpeace Girl, Homeless Guy, Ensemble
 "What Do You Want, Paul?" - Mr. Davidson
 "Cup of Roasted Coffee" - Nora, Zoey, Emma
 "Cup of Poisoned Coffee (Reprise)" - Nora, Zoey, Ensemble
 "Show Me Your Hands" - Sam, Cops
 "You Tied up My Heart" - Sam
 "Join Us (And Die)" - Charlotte, Sam
Act 2
 "Not Your Seed" - Alice, Deb, Hatchetfield Bee
 "Show Stoppin Number" - Professor Hidgens, Greg, Stu
 "America Is Great Again" - General McNamara, Soldiers
 "Let Him Come" - Mr. Davidson, Professor Hidgens, Nora	
 "Let It Out" - Paul, Ensemble
 "Inevitable" - Paul, EnsembleA cast recording was released on December 24, 2018.

Sequels 

The Guy Who Didn't Like Musicals served as the first installment in StarKid's horror-comedy series the Hatchetfield Series. A second musical entitled Black Friday was produced and performed by Team Starkid in the fall of 2019. The show takes place in Hatchetfield, and features several recurring characters from The Guy Who Didn’t Like Musicals. The fact that all of the characters in said musical died has led many to theorize that Black Friday takes place in an alternate dimension, secondary timeline, or time loop, with the final song indeed posing the question of whether "tomorrow will come" as characters from The Guy Who Didn't Like Musicals fill the stage. The show ran from October 31-December 8, 2019 and featured most of the original cast and crew members.

As a result of plans being postponed due to the COVID-19 pandemic, StarKid Productions premiered a series of live-readings as a new installment in the Hatchetfield series named Nightmare Time. The first season of was announced on October 1, 2020 with the entire casts of both The Guy Who Didn't Like Musicals and Black Friday returning. The series featured several returning characters from both series. The first episode of the series was streamed live to YouTube on October 10, 2020 featuring two stories: The Hatchetfield Ape-Man and Watcher World. The final two episodes were performed live on October 17 and October 24, 2020 featuring the stories Forever & Always, Time Bastard, Jane's A Car and The Witch in the Web. These episodes were then released on YouTube on February 14, 2021. A second season was announced on October 8, 2021. The series featured 4 episodes with six stories: Honey Queen, Perky's Buds, Abstinence Camp, Daddy, Killer Track and Yellow Jacket. The entire cast of the original series returned apart from Kendall Nicole and Robert Manion and they were joined by Jae Hughes and Bryce Charles. The episodes were announced to be released weekly on YouTube from May 20, 2022 to June 10, 2022.

A short film titled “Workin’ Boys” was announced in 2019 as a reward for Black Friday’s Kickstarter campaign. Production of the film was delayed due to the COVID-19 pandemic. 

A third musical entitled Nerdy Prudes Must Die is currently being written by the same writing team of Black Friday. It was going to be performed sometime in 2020 but due to the COVID-19 pandemic, it had been postponed indefinitely. In September 2022 it was announced that it will be performed in February 2023 at the El Porto theatre in Hollywood with at least some of the cast and crew returning as part of "Starkid Returns".

Critical reception
The Guy Who Didn't Like Musicals received generally positive reviews from local and online publications.

Awards 

The Guy Who Didn't Like Musicals received fifteen nominations in twelve categories at the 2019 BroadwayWorld.com Los Angeles Regional Awards.  It was nominated in every category for which it was eligible, that is to say, every local (non-touring) musical category.  It won in every category except three.  Every actor in the musical was nominated for their performance except for Jeff Blim. Every nominee in the category Best Featured Actor in a Musical was from The Guy Who Didn't Like Musicals.

See also 
 Lists of musicals

References 

2018 musicals
2018 YouTube videos
Horror plays
Original musicals
Plays set in Michigan
Plays set in the 21st century
Science fiction musicals
StarKid Productions musicals